Shaun Walliss is an Australian former professional rugby league footballer who played in the 1990s. He played for Western Suburbs, the Illawarra Steelers and South Sydney in the NSWRL/ARL competition.

Playing career
Walliss made his first grade debut for Illawarra in round 17 of the 1993 NSWRL season against the Gold Coast Seagulls. Walliss came off the interchange bench in a 26-0 victory at WIN Stadium. In 1995, Walliss joined South Sydney. He played two seasons with Souths before switching to Western Suburbs ahead of the 1997 ARL season. Walliss played one match for Western Suburbs which was in round 1 of the 1997 season against the Gold Coast Chargers.

References

1972 births
Western Suburbs Magpies players
South Sydney Rabbitohs players
Illawarra Steelers players
Australian rugby league players
Rugby league second-rows
Rugby league props
Living people